Guajará Esporte Clube, commonly referred to as Guajará, is a Brazilian football club based in Guajará-Mirim, Rondônia. The club's senior team is inactive since 2020.

They competed in the Copa do Brasil once.

History
The club was founded on October 31, 1952. Guajará won the Campeonato Rondoniense in 2000. The club competed in the Copa do Brasil in 2001, when they were eliminated in the First Stage by Rio Branco.

Achievements

 Campeonato Rondoniense:
 Winners (1): 2000

Stadium
Guajará Esporte Clube play their home games at Estádio João Saldanha. The stadium has a maximum capacity of 5,000 people.

References

Association football clubs established in 1952
Football clubs in Rondônia
1952 establishments in Brazil